Robinson Female Seminary was an American girl's day and boarding school in Exeter, New Hampshire. It was founded by the benefactor, William Robinson, a native and early resident of that town. By his last will, he bequeathed the residue of his large estate to the town of his birth, to establish a female seminary. The town of Exeter accepted the bequest, and adopted a code of regulations for the management of the contemplated institution, which was sanctioned by a legislative enactment.

In 1867, the institution was opened for the reception of pupils, and in 1869, it was fully organized and established in the new building erected for it. Robinson seminary was the second school in the U.S. to introduce domestic science into its course. The seminary closed in 1955.

History

The Robinson Seminary was established through the liberal bequest of William Robinson, a native of Exeter, but for many years a resident of Augusta, Georgia, where his death occurred during the Civil War. It was his request that "the course of instruction should be such as would tend to make female scholars equal to all the practical duties of life; such a course of education as would enable them to compete, and successfully, too, with their brothers throughout the world when they take their part in the actual duties of life." In admitting applicants to the seminary "the preference should always be given to the poor and the orphan."

A plan for the establishment and regulation of the seminary was carefully elaborated by a committee, adopted by the town, and received the sanction of the legislature of New Hampshire. The advantages offered by the school were extended to "any girl resident in the town who had reached the age of nine years and was qualified for the grammar school," without the payment of tuition.

A school was opened in 1867 in the old town hall. In 1869, the structure was completed. The seminary went into operation in September of the same year.

Administration
The fund and school were under the management of a board of trustees chosen by the town.

Eben S. Stearns, a graduate of Harvard College in 1841, was the first principal. He remained at the head of the seminary until 1875, during which time the school was thoroughly organized and very prosperous. Three years after organization there were nine instructors and 252 students. His successors during the following eight years were Harriet E. Paine and Annie M. Kilham. In 1883, George N. Cross, A. M., was appointed principal.

When Cross arrived at the Robinson seminary in 1883, it was a critical time in the history of the school. The seminary had been in existence for 13 years and was suffering from the poverty resulting from depleted funds. The new principal went to work developing policies and a practical course of study. Within a few years, from an obscure school possessing not much more than extensive grounds and a bare, unfurnished building, Robinson seminary became a school known all over New England, housed in one of the most beautiful school buildings in the country. Years before art decorations in schools had been suggested elsewhere, Cross had hung the walls of his schoolrooms all over with costly and beautiful pictures and had lined the corridors with casts of Greek and Roman sculpture. But the extensive art collections were not merely for ornament. Every picture, bust and bas-relief had some share in Cross' plan for making real and vivid the lessons in history, mythology, or literature, as well as the history of art. After 23 years of service, Cross retired to devote his time to lecturing.

The corps of instructors consisted of the principal and assistants.

Most of the students of the seminary lived in Exeter, though nonresidents could be admitted upon the payment of a small tuition fee, and a few such were always in the school.

Architecture and fittings

Designed by architect Rufus Sargent, the seminary was built of brick, with a granite basement, and three stories in height.

It was furnished with a reference library, containing more than 6,000 volumes. There was extensive apparatus for illustrating natural philosophy and physiology, a dissecting microscope, and a Bausch & Lomb's student's microscope, with eyepieces and objectives of high and low powers. There were cabinets of minerals and geological specimens, a set of Henslow's botanical charts, together with various other maps and charts. A chemical laboratory and lecture room were fitted up for courses in general chemistry and qualitative analysis.

The Robinson seminary placed itself alongside the Norwich Free Academy by the purchase of several hundred rare engravings, etchings, busts, and statuary, so that in the various halls, rooms, and stairways there was rare art, classical and historical. Cross began this collection through the various entertainments by the school, but later,  substantial gifts were made.

Course of study
The course of study was arranged to extend over a period of eight years. There was also a course preparatory to admission to college of three years. As complete an education could be obtained at the seminary as at almost any other institution of the kind in the U.S. The great majority of the pupils did not complete the course. Out of an attendance of from 150 to 200, the number of graduates by 1898 averaged yearly about 10 only. But far the larger number of the pupils remained long enough to acquire an adequate education.

In planning the education of the girls, Cross kept in view three ends: the development of the homemaking spirit and the dignity of domesticity, the cultivation of self-dependence, and the ability to earn an honorable livelihood; and for those who desired it, a thorough preparation for a college course.

Robinson seminary was the second school in the U.S. to introduce domestic science into its course. Its demonstration kitchen furnished a model to be adopted by hundreds of schools. Cooking lessons were taught by a graduate of the Boston Cooking School.

For many years, a post-graduate course in pedagogy and methods of teaching was given to those graduates who desired to teach, and many of New England's teachers gained from that course their first knowledge of the science.

Closing
The Robinson Seminary served as the town of Exeter's public school for girls beyond the elementary school level until 1955. Boys in those years attended Tuck High School. In 1954 the town's school district passed a bond issue to build an addition to Tuck School, creating Exeter High School, which saw the graduation of its first coeducational class in 1956. The Robinson Seminary building was destroyed by a fire in 1961, and the site is now occupied by the Lincoln Street Elementary School.

Notable people

Alumni
 Alice Brown (writer) (1857–1948), novelist, poet, playwright
 Dudley Dudley (politician) (born 1936), political activist
 Mary Lemist Titcomb (1852–1932), librarian

Faculty
 Anna Barrows (1861–1948), educator, author
 Mary Stuart James MacMurphy (1846–1934), teacher, lecturer, clubwoman, author

References

Further reading
 William Robinson and the School be Founded: Commemorating the 100th Anniversary of Robinson Female Seminary, 1967

External links
 Trustees of the Robinson Fund, via exeternh.gov
 Exeter v. Robinson Heirs, via casetext.com
 1907 and 1910 photos of Robinson Female Seminary, via Postcards from Exeter, by Carol Walker Aten, Arcadia Publishing, 2003, p. 105.

Educational institutions established in 1867
1867 establishments in New Hampshire
Exeter, New Hampshire
Women's education in the United States
Female seminaries in the United States
Schools in Rockingham County, New Hampshire
Boarding schools
History of women in New Hampshire
1955 disestablishments in the United States